Bayesian programming is a formalism and a methodology for having a technique to specify probabilistic models and solve problems when less than the necessary information is available.

Edwin T. Jaynes proposed that probability could be considered as an alternative and an extension of logic for rational reasoning with incomplete and uncertain information. In his founding book Probability Theory: The Logic of Science he developed this theory and proposed what he called “the robot,” which was not
a physical device, but an inference engine to automate probabilistic reasoning—a kind of Prolog for probability instead of logic. Bayesian programming is a formal and concrete implementation of this "robot".

Bayesian programming may also be seen as an algebraic formalism to specify graphical models such as, for instance, Bayesian networks, dynamic Bayesian networks, Kalman filters or hidden Markov models. Indeed, Bayesian Programming is more general than Bayesian networks and has a power of expression equivalent to probabilistic factor graphs.

Formalism 

A Bayesian program is a means of specifying a family of probability distributions.

The constituent elements of a Bayesian program are presented below:

 

 A program is constructed from a description and a question.
 A description is constructed using some specification as given by the programmer and an identification or learning process for the parameters not completely specified by the specification, using a data set.
 A specification is constructed from a set of pertinent variables, a decomposition and a set of forms.
 Forms are either parametric forms or questions to other Bayesian programs.
 A question specifies which probability distribution has to be computed.

Description 

The purpose of a description is to specify an effective method of computing a joint probability distribution
on a set of variables  given a set of experimental data  and some
specification . This joint distribution is denoted as: .

To specify preliminary knowledge , the programmer must undertake the following:

 Define the set of relevant variables  on which the joint distribution is defined.
 Decompose the joint distribution (break it into relevant independent or conditional probabilities).
 Define the forms of each of the distributions (e.g., for each variable, one of the list of probability distributions).

Decomposition 

Given a partition of  containing  subsets,  variables are defined
, each corresponding to one of these subsets.
Each variable  is obtained as the conjunction of the variables 
belonging to the  subset. Recursive application of Bayes' theorem leads to:

 

Conditional independence hypotheses then allow further simplifications. A conditional
independence hypothesis for variable  is defined by choosing some variable 
among the variables appearing in the conjunction , labelling  as the
conjunction of these chosen variables and setting:

 

We then obtain:

 

Such a simplification of the joint distribution as a product of simpler distributions is
called a decomposition, derived using the chain rule.

This ensures that each variable appears at the most once on the left of a conditioning
bar, which is the necessary and sufficient condition to write mathematically valid
decompositions.

Forms 

Each distribution  appearing in the product is then associated
with either a parametric form (i.e., a function ) or a question to another Bayesian program .

Learning
takes place when some of these parameters are computed using the data set .

An important feature of Bayesian Programming is this capacity to use questions to other Bayesian programs as components of the definition of a new Bayesian program.  is obtained by some inferences done by another Bayesian program defined by the specifications  and the data . This is similar to calling a subroutine in classical programming and provides an easy way to build hierarchical models.

Question 

Given a description (i.e.), a question is obtained by partitioning 
into three sets: the searched variables, the known variables and
the free variables.

conjunction of the variables belonging to
these sets.

A question is defined as the set
of distributions:

 

each instantiated question being the distribution:

Inference 

Given the joint distribution , it is always possible to compute any possible question using the following general inference:

 

where the first equality results from the marginalization rule, the second
results from Bayes' theorem and the third corresponds to a second application of marginalization. The denominator appears to be a normalization term and can be replaced by a constant .

Theoretically, this allows to solve any Bayesian inference problem. In practice,
however, the cost of computing exhaustively and exactly  is too great in almost all cases.

Replacing the joint distribution by its decomposition we get:

 

which is usually a much simpler expression to compute, as the dimensionality of the problem is considerably reduced by the decomposition into a product of lower dimension distributions.

Example

Bayesian spam detection

The purpose of Bayesian spam filtering is to eliminate junk e-mails.

The problem is very easy to formulate. E-mails should be classified
into one of two categories: non-spam or spam. The only available information to classify the e-mails is their content: a set of words. Using these words without taking the order into account is commonly called a bag of words model.

The classifier should furthermore be able to adapt to its user and to learn
from experience. Starting from an initial standard setting, the classifier should
modify its internal parameters when the user disagrees with its own decision.
It will hence adapt to the user's criteria to differentiate between non-spam and
spam. It will improve its results as it encounters increasingly classified e-mails.

Variables 

The variables necessary to write this program are as follows:
 : a binary variable, false if the e-mail is not spam and true otherwise.
 :  binary variables.  is true if the  word of the dictionary is present in the text.

These  binary variables sum up all the information
about an e-mail.

Decomposition 

Starting from the joint distribution and applying recursively Bayes' theorem we obtain:

 

This is an exact mathematical expression.

It can be drastically simplified by assuming that the probability of appearance of a word knowing the nature of the text (spam or not) is independent of the appearance of the other words. This is the naive Bayes assumption and this makes this spam filter a naive Bayes model.

For instance, the programmer can assume that:

 

to finally obtain:

 

This kind of assumption is known as the naive Bayes' assumption. It is "naive" in the sense that the independence between words is clearly not completely true. For instance, it completely neglects that the appearance of pairs of words may be more significant than isolated appearances. However, the programmer may assume this hypothesis and may develop the model and the associated inferences to test how reliable and efficient it is.

Parametric forms 

To be able to compute the joint distribution, the programmer must now specify the
 distributions appearing in the decomposition:

  is a prior defined, for instance, by 
 Each of the   forms  may be specified using Laplace rule of succession (this is a pseudocounts-based smoothing technique to counter the zero-frequency problem of words never-seen-before):
 
 

where  stands for the number of appearances of the  word in non-spam e-mails and  stands for the total number of non-spam e-mails. Similarly,  stands for the number of appearances of the  word in spam e-mails and  stands for the total number of spam e-mails.

Identification 

The identification of these parameters could be done either by batch processing a series of classified e-mails or by an incremental updating of the parameters using the user's classifications of the e-mails as they arrive.

Both methods could be combined: the system could start with initial standard values of these parameters issued from a generic database, then some incremental learning customizes the classifier to each individual user.

Question 

The question asked to the program is: "what is the probability for a given text to be spam knowing which words appear and don't appear in this text?"
It can be formalized by:

 

which can be computed as follows:

 

The denominator appears to be a normalization constant. It is not necessary to compute it to decide if we are dealing with spam. For instance, an easy trick is to compute the ratio:

 

This computation is faster and easier because it requires only  products.

Bayesian program 

The Bayesian spam filter program is completely defined by:

Bayesian filter, Kalman filter and hidden Markov model

Bayesian filters (often called Recursive Bayesian estimation) are generic probabilistic models for time evolving processes. Numerous models are particular instances of this generic approach, for instance: the Kalman filter or the Hidden Markov model (HMM).

Variables 

 Variables  are a time series of observation variables on the same horizon.

Decomposition 

The decomposition is based:
 on an initial state at time : .

Parametrical forms 

The parametrical forms are not constrained and different choices lead to different well-known models: see Kalman filters and Hidden Markov models just below.

Question 

The typical question for such models is : what is the probability distribution for the state at time  knowing the observations from instant  to ?

The most common case is Bayesian filtering where , which searches for the present state, knowing past observations.

However, it is also possible , to extrapolate a future state from past observations, or to do smoothing , to recover a past state from observations made either before or after that instant.

More complicated questions may also be asked as shown below in the HMM section.

 

Another interesting point of view for this equation is to consider that there are two phases: a
prediction phase and an estimation phase:
 During the prediction phase, the state is predicted using the dynamic model and the estimation of the state at the previous moment:

 
 During the estimation phase, the prediction is either confirmed or invalidated using the last observation:

Bayesian program

Kalman filter

The very well-known Kalman filters are a special case of Bayesian
filters.

They are defined by the following Bayesian program:

 
 Variables are continuous.
 The transition model  and the observation model  are both specified using Gaussian laws with means that are linear functions of the conditioning variables.

With these hypotheses and by using the recursive formula, it is possible to solve
the inference problem analytically to answer the usual  question.
This leads to an extremely efficient algorithm, which explains the popularity of Kalman filters and the number of their everyday applications.

When there are no obvious linear transition and observation models, it is still often
possible, using a first-order Taylor's expansion, to treat these models as locally linear.
This generalization is commonly called the extended Kalman filter.

Hidden Markov model

Hidden Markov models (HMMs) are another very popular specialization of Bayesian filters.

They are defined by the following Bayesian program:

 
 Variables are treated as being discrete.
 The transition model  and the observation model  are
both specified using probability matrices.
 The question most frequently asked of HMMs is:
 

What is the most probable series of states that leads to the present state, knowing the past observations?

This particular question may be answered with a specific and very efficient algorithm
called the Viterbi algorithm.

The Baum–Welch algorithm has been developed
for HMMs.

Applications

Academic applications 

Since 2000, Bayesian programming has been used to develop both robotics applications and life sciences models.

Robotics 

In robotics, bayesian programming was applied to autonomous robotics, robotic CAD systems, advanced driver-assistance systems, robotic arm control, mobile robotics, human-robot interaction, human-vehicle interaction (Bayesian autonomous driver models) video game avatar programming and training  and real-time strategy games (AI).

Life sciences 

In life sciences, bayesian programming was used in vision to reconstruct shape from motion, to model visuo-vestibular interaction and to study saccadic eye movements; in speech perception and control to study early speech acquisition and the emergence of articulatory-acoustic systems; and to model handwriting perception and control.

Pattern recognition 
Bayesian program learning has potential applications voice recognition and synthesis, image recognition and natural language processing. It employs the principles of compositionality (building abstract representations from parts), causality (building complexity from parts) and learning to learn (using previously recognized concepts to ease the creation of new concepts).

Possibility theories 

The comparison between probabilistic approaches (not only bayesian programming) and possibility theories continues to be debated.

Possibility theories like, for instance, fuzzy sets, fuzzy logic and possibility theory are alternatives to probability to model uncertainty. They argue that probability is insufficient or inconvenient to model certain aspects of incomplete/uncertain knowledge.

The defense of probability is mainly based on Cox's theorem, which starts from four postulates concerning rational reasoning in the presence of uncertainty. It demonstrates that the only mathematical framework that satisfies these postulates is probability theory. The argument is that any approach other than probability necessarily infringes one of these postulates and the value of that infringement.

Probabilistic programming 

The purpose of probabilistic programming is to unify the scope of classical programming languages with probabilistic modeling (especially bayesian networks) to deal with uncertainty while profiting from the programming languages' expressiveness to encode complexity.

Extended classical programming languages include logical languages as proposed in Probabilistic Horn Abduction, Independent Choice Logic, PRISM, and ProbLog which proposes an extension of Prolog.

It can also be extensions of functional programming languages (essentially Lisp and Scheme) such as IBAL or CHURCH. The underlying programming languages can be object-oriented as in BLOG and FACTORIE or more standard ones as in CES and FIGARO.

The purpose of Bayesian programming is different. Jaynes' precept of "probability as logic" argues that probability is an extension of and an alternative to logic above which a complete theory of rationality, computation and programming can be rebuilt. Bayesian programming attempts to replace classical languages with a programming approach based on probability that considers incompleteness and uncertainty.

The precise comparison between the semantics and power of expression of Bayesian and probabilistic programming is an open question.

See also

References

Further reading

External links 
 A companion site to the Bayesian programming book where to download ProBT an inference engine dedicated to Bayesian programming.
 The Bayesian-programming.org site  for the promotion of Bayesian programming with detailed information and numerous publications.

Bayesian statistics
Artificial intelligence